Actinopus castelo is a species of mygalomorph spider in the family Actinopodidae. It can be found in Brazil.

The specific name refers to Castelo do Piauí, a municipality in the state of Piauí, Brazil.

References 

castelo
Spiders described in 2020
Spiders of Brazil